Michael Arnold (born October 1979) is a British novelist who writes historical fiction.

Early life and education 
Michael Arnold was brought up and educated in the market town of Petersfield, in Hampshire, where he still lives with his wife and three children.

Career
Arnold worked in the financial services industry for 10 years before writing full-time. He started creating his series of civil war novels in 2009. The first book, Traitor's Blood, was published in 2010 to positive reviews. Since then Arnold has released seven more novels in this series, and started a new series called 'Highwayman'.

Books

The Civil War Chronicles 

Traitor's Blood (John Murray, 2010)
Devil's Charge (John Murray, 2011)
Hunter's Rage (John Murray, 2012)
Assassin's Reign (Hodder & Stoughton, 2013)
Stryker & the Angels of Death (Hodder & Stoughton, 2013)
Warlord's Gold (Hodder & Stoughton, 2014)
Marston Moor (Hodder & Stoughton, July 2015)
Prince's Gambit (Hodder & Stoughton, May 2015)

Highwayman

 Highwayman Ironside (Endeavour Press, 2013)
 Winter Swarm (Endeavour Press, 2015)

References

External links 
Official website
Profile at Hodder & Stoughton

1979 births
Living people
21st-century British novelists
British male novelists
People from Petersfield
British historical fiction writers